Nikos Melissas (born 24 February 1993) is a Greek professional footballer who plays as a goalkeeper for Cypriot First Division club Nea Salamina.

Career

PAOK

Loan moves
On 10 August 2017, Melissas was given on loan to newly promoted side Lamia.

On 7 June 2018, his loan was extended by an additional year.

On 24 June 2019, he signed a new contract with PAOK, running until the summer of 2022.

Career statistics

References

External links

1993 births
Living people
Greek footballers
Super League Greece players
Football League (Greece) players
PAOK FC players
PAS Lamia 1964 players
Panetolikos F.C. players
Association football goalkeepers
Footballers from Thessaloniki